Bob Slowik (born May 16, 1954) is a gridiron football coach who is currently the linebackers coach for the Calgary Stampeders of the Canadian Football League (CFL). He was also a defensive coordinator for the Denver Broncos, Green Bay Packers, Cleveland Browns and Chicago Bears in the National Football League (NFL) and for the Montreal Alouettes in the CFL. He has also been a coach for Rutgers, East Carolina University, and the Dallas Cowboys.

Personal life
Slowik's son, Bobby Slowik, is currently the offensive coordinator for the Houston Texans of the National Football League (NFL).

External links
Calgary Stampeders bio
Official Redskins website biography of Coach Slowik

References 

1954 births
Green Bay Packers coaches
Cleveland Browns coaches
Chicago Bears coaches
Denver Broncos coaches
Living people
Washington Redskins coaches
Montreal Alouettes coaches
Calgary Stampeders coaches
Rutgers Scarlet Knights football coaches
East Carolina Pirates football coaches